The Border is a 1982 American neo-noir drama film directed by Tony Richardson and starring Jack Nicholson, Harvey Keitel, Valerie Perrine, Elpidia Carrillo and Warren Oates.

Plot
Immigration enforcement agent Charlie Smith lives in California with his wife, Marcy, in a trailer. She persuades him to move to a duplex in El Paso shared by her friend and border agent Cat.  She opens a charge account and starts to purchase expensive items like a water bed as she tries to build a dream home.

Cat gradually introduces Charlie to the human smuggling operation he runs with their supervisor Red. Though Charlie initially declines to participate, his wife's free-spending ways make him finally take part in the operation. Meanwhile, a young Mexican mother, Maria, that he has observed is detained, and while she is in their custody, one of Cat's drivers abducts her baby for an illegal adoption. Cat warns the driver not to do anything but transport people in trucks, and that if he runs drugs or babies, Cat will hurt him.

Charlie finally realizes that Cat and Red are killing drivers who make money off side ventures or anyone who gets in their way. Charlie makes it clear to Cat that he will not be a party to murder. In the film's climax, he is forced to kill Cat. He tracks down the kidnapped infant and returns it to Maria.

Cast
 Jack Nicholson as Charlie Smith
 Harvey Keitel as "Cat"
 Valerie Perrine as Marcy
 Warren Oates as "Red"
 Elpidia Carrillo as Maria
 Shannon Wilcox as Savannah
 Jeff Morris as J.J.
 Dirk Blocker as "Beef"
 Lonny Chapman as Andy

Production notes
The opening earthquake scenes were filmed in Antigua -specifically in La Recoleccion ruins- and Guatemala City, Guatemala.

Phil Hartman dubbed a few Nicholson lines. (Source: Late Night with David Letterman interview April 5, 1989)

Reception
Vincent Canby of The New York Times said the movie "has the sort of predictable outrage and shape of a made-for-television movie. It has suspense but little excitement. Once the people and the situation have been introduced, there's not a single surprise in the film, nothing of the uncharacteristic sort that differentiates the adequate melodrama from one that is special and memorable. Like so many films prompted by real-life social problems, The Border is a movie in which the characters appear to have been created to fit the events. Missing is any sense of particularity, as well as the excitement that comes when the members of the audience are allowed to discover some sort of truth for themselves."

On Rotten Tomatoes, the film holds a rating of 65% from 26 reviews.

References

External links
 
 
 
 
 

1982 films
1980s English-language films
1980s Spanish-language films
American crime drama films
American crime thriller films
1980s crime thriller films
1982 crime drama films
Films scored by Ry Cooder
Films shot in Texas
Films shot in Los Angeles
Films shot in El Paso, Texas
Films set in Texas
Films directed by Tony Richardson
Universal Pictures films
Films about illegal immigration to the United States
RKO Pictures films
American neo-noir films
1980s American films